The Salvation may refer to:

 The Salvation (album), an album by Skyzoo
 The Salvation (film), a 2014 Danish western film

See also  
 Salvation (disambiguation)